The Oklahoma City metropolitan area is an urban region in the Southern United States. It is the largest metropolitan area in the state of Oklahoma and contains the state capital and principal city, Oklahoma City. It is often known as the Oklahoma City Metro (sometimes shortened to simply "the Metro"), Oklahoma City Metroplex, or Greater Oklahoma City in addition to the nicknames Oklahoma City itself is known for, such as OKC or "the 405".

Counties in the Oklahoma City metropolitan area include Canadian, Cleveland, Grady, Lincoln, Logan, McClain, and Oklahoma. According to the 2020 U.S. census, the metropolitan region had a population of 1,425,695, up from 1,083,346 at the 2000 census.

The micro urban area of Shawnee (in Pottawatomie County) is included in Oklahoma City's Combined Statistical Area (CSA) which brings the area population to 1,498,693. The Oklahoma City – Shawnee CSA is also included as part of the I-35 Megalopolis.

Principal communities
Principal cities
Oklahoma City
Shawnee *CSA

Secondary cities
Norman
Edmond

Suburbs

Bethany
Chandler
Chickasha
Choctaw
Del City
El Reno
Guthrie
Harrah
Jones
Langston
McLoud
Midwest City
Moore
Mustang
Newcastle
Nichols Hills
Nicoma Park
Noble
Piedmont
Purcell
Spencer
Tuttle
The Village
Warr Acres
Yukon

Exurbs
Stillwater
Kingfisher
Counties

Canadian
Cleveland
Grady
Lincoln
Logan
McClain
Oklahoma
Pottawatomie *CSA

Demographics

The Oklahoma City metropolitan area, being the state's principal and largest metropolitan statistical area, had a population of 1,425,695 at the 2020 census, up from 1,252,987 in 2010; the 2021 American Community Survey estimated its population increased to 1,441,647. With a 2021 median age of 36.1, the sex ratio was 51% female and 49% male.

According to the U.S. Census Bureau in 2010, its racial and ethnic makeup was 67.4% non-Hispanic white, 10.4% African American, 4.1% Native American, 2.8% Asian, 0.1% Pacific Islander, 5.5% from other races or ethnicities, 5.2% multiracial, and 11.3% Hispanic or Latino of any race. During the 2021 American Community Survey, its racial and ethnic makeup was 62% white, 10% African American, 3% Native American, 3% Asian, 1% other, 8% multiracial, and 14% Hispanic or Latino of any race.

In 2021, there were an estimated 565,309 households with an average of 2.5 persons per household; among them, 61% were married-couples and 18% were non-family households. Approximately 51% of its population was married. Of its 615,726 housing units at the census estimates, 92% were occupied and 64% were owner-occupied. An estimated 32% of its housing units were constructed since 2017, reflecting the metropolitan population growth. There was a median owner-occupied value of $190,800 and 36% of its units ranged from $100-200,000, while 17% were valued at under $100,000.

As of 2016, the U.S. Census Bureau estimated the median household income in the MSA was $55,065, and the median family income was $68,797. The per capita income for the MSA in 2015 was $27,316. For the population age 25 years and over, 88.4% was a high school graduate for higher, and 29.8% had a bachelor's degree or higher. By the 2021 ACS census estimates, its median household income increased to $61,815; 40% of the population made under $50,000 while 32% made from $50-100,000 annually. The metropolis had a per capita income of $32,703. Among the population economically, 14.5% of its population lived at or below the poverty line. According to Forbes, its cost of living was 6% below the national average.

Religiously and spiritually, the Association of Religion Data Archives in 2020 reported that the Southern Baptist Convention was the metropolitan area's largest Christian tradition with 213,008 members, Christianity being the area's predominant religion. Non/interdenominational Protestants were the second largest tradition with 195,158 members. The Roman Catholic Church claimed 142,491 adherents throughout the metropolitan region and Pentecostals within the Assemblies of God USA numbered 48,470. The remainder of Christians in the area held to predominantly Evangelical Christian beliefs in numerous evangelical Protestant denominations. Outside of Christendom, there were 4,230 practitioners of Hinduism and 2,078 Mahayana Buddhists. An estimated 8,904 residents practiced Islam during this study, making it the second-largest religion in the area.

Economy 

The metropolitan region has, since the 21st century, grown into a diversified economy. Its diverse economy has been primarily stimulated by oil and natural gas, fast food, retail, banking, telecommunications, and technology companies. Notable companies with a large presence in the area have been or currently include Chesapeake Energy, Devon Energy, Sonic, Taco Mayo, Hobby Lobby, Bank of America, AT&T and Verizon, and U.S. Cellular.

Sports

Transportation

Major airports
Will Rogers World Airport (passenger and cargo)
Tinker Air Force Base (military)
University of Oklahoma Westheimer Airport (general, university)
Wiley Post Airport (general)

Major highways
 Oklahoma State Highway 3
 Oklahoma State Highway 4
 Oklahoma State Highway 9
 Interstate 35
 Oklahoma State Highway 37
 Interstate 40
 Interstate 44
 U.S. Route 62
 U.S. Route 66
 Oklahoma State Highway 74
 U.S. Route 77
 Oklahoma State Highway 152
 Interstate 235
 Interstate 240
 U.S. Route 277
H.E. Bailey Spur
John Kilpatrick Turnpike

Mass transit
Citylink Edmond, local Edmond and Commuter Bus to downtown Oklahoma City
Heritage Express Trolley, connects Heritage Park with downtown El Reno
EMBARK, state's largest transit agency; bus and trolley service throughout Oklahoma County and, as of August 2019, for Norman
Oklahoma City Streetcar, tram service within the city of Oklahoma City (primarily downtown)
Oklahoma City Regional Transit District, planned Commuter Rail and expanded metropolitan bus service

Campus mass transportation
CART, local Norman area bus service and Express Bus to downtown Oklahoma City. Now strictly a campus service for the University of Oklahoma as of August 2019 and known as Campus Area Rapid Transit.

References

 
Metropolitan areas of Oklahoma